The Axelson Aircraft Engine Company was a manufacturer of aircraft engines based in Los Angeles in the late 1920s.

Their engines were originally known as "FLOCO", because the manufacturer was originally Frank L. Odenbreidt Co. Their products included the 115 hp Axelson A-7-R and 150 hp Axelson B.  Axelson engines were used to power the Swallow F28-AX, among other contemporary aircraft.

Notes

References
 
 
 Approved Type Certificate 16

External links
 Photograph of the Axelson factory, circa 1930

Defunct aircraft engine manufacturers of the United States